The Australia men's national field hockey team (nicknamed the Kookaburras) is one of the nation's most successful top-level sporting teams. They are the only Australian team in any sport to receive medals at six straight  Summer Olympic Games (1992–2012). The Kookaburras placed in the top four in every Olympics between 1980 and 2012; in 2016, the Kookaburras placed sixth. They also won the Hockey World Cup in 1986, 2010 and 2014.

The Kookaburras' inability to win an Olympic gold medal despite their perennial competitiveness, led many in the Australian hockey community to speak of a "curse" afflicting the team, finally broken in 2004 with the win in Athens. However, they failed to win Gold after that after losses in subsequent Olympics including a loss to Belgium in the Gold Medal Match of 2020 Tokyo Olympics - the Kookaburras instead won the silver medal.

History
Australia's first men's team competed in an international match in 1922.

The first major competition won by the national team was the 1983 World Championships held in Karachi.

Participations

Australia's first men's team competed at the Olympics in field hockey at the 1956 Summer Olympics.

Australia did not medal at the 1984 Summer Olympics or the 1988 Summer Olympics. At the 1992 Summer Olympics, Australia earned a silver medal, losing gold to Germany. At the 1996 Summer Olympics, Australia finished third, earning a bronze medal.

The team won their first Olympic gold medal at the 2004 Summer Olympics. Barry Dancer coached the side.

Should Australia win the gold medal at the 2012 London Olympics they will become the first national team in field hockey history to hold all four international titles available to them simultaneously. They would hold titles in the 2012 Olympics, 2010 World Cup, 2011 Champions Trophy and their continental championship (2011 Oceania Cup) at the same time. Along with those four titles Australia also holds the Commonwealth Games title from the 2010 championships.

Tournament records

Team

Current squad
The following 20 players were named in the Kookaburras squad for the FIH Pro League matches against Germany and India in Rourkela.

Head coach: Colin Batch

The remainder of the 2023 national squad is as follows:

Recent call-ups
The following players have received call-ups to the national team in the last twelve months.

Notable players
Ric Charlesworth
Jamie Dwyer

Results

2023 Fixtures & Results

XV FIH World Cup

FIH Pro League

Family
Barry Dancer/Brent Dancer and Ric Charlesworth/Jonathan Charlesworth are two pairs of father as coach and son as player while both were affiliated with the national team in those positions.

Recognition
 1981: Australian Sport Awards  Team of the Year
 1987: Australian Sport Awards  Team of the Year
 2004: Australian Sport Awards  International Team of the Year
 2014: AIS Sport Performance Awards Team of the Year.

References

The Tokyo Organising Committee of the Olympic and Paralympic Games n.d., Tokyo 2020, viewed 3 August 2021, <https://olympics.com/tokyo-2020/olympic-games/en/results/hockey/result-men-sfnl-000100-.htm>.

External links

FIH profile

 
Field hockey
Oceanian men's national field hockey teams
1922 establishments in Australia